The Neungseong Gu clan is one of the Korean clans. Their Bon-gwan is in Hwasun County, South Jeolla Province. According to the research held in 2015, the number of Neungseong Gu clan's member was 174,161. Gu Jon-yu was possibly of Chinese or Korean. The origin of Gu Jon-yu has been disputed.

See also 
 Korean clans of foreign origin

References

External links
 능성구씨대종회

 
Korean clan names of Chinese origin
Gu clans